In point-set topology, Kuratowski's closure-complement problem asks for the largest number of distinct sets obtainable by repeatedly applying the set operations of closure and complement to a given starting subset of a topological space.  The answer is 14.  This result was first published by Kazimierz Kuratowski in 1922. It gained additional exposure in Kuratowski's fundamental monograph Topologie (first published in French in 1933; the first English translation appeared in 1966) before achieving fame as a textbook exercise in John L. Kelley's 1955 classic, General Topology.

Proof
The following three identities imply that no more than 14 distinct sets are obtainable:

 . (The closure operation is idempotent.)
 . (The complement operation is an involution.)
 . (Or equivalently , using identity (2)).

The first two are trivial. (The operation  is idempotent.)

A subset realizing the maximum of 14 is called a 14-set.  The space of real numbers under the usual topology contains 14-sets.  Here is one example:

where  denotes an open interval and  denotes a closed interval. Let  denote this set. Then the following 14 sets are accessible:

 , the set shown above.

Further results
Despite its origin within the context of a topological space, Kuratowski's closure-complement problem is actually more algebraic than topological.  A surprising abundance of closely related problems and results have appeared since 1960, many of which have little or nothing to do with point-set topology.

The closure-complement operations yield a monoid that can be used to classify topological spaces.

References

External links 
 The Kuratowski Closure-Complement Theorem by B. J. Gardner and Marcel Jackson
 The Kuratowski Closure-Complement Problem by Mark Bowron

Topology
Mathematical problems